Kilmany Parish Church is an ancient church building in Kilmany, Fife, Scotland. Dating to 1768, it is Category A listed.

The church's pulpit was re-seated in 1859 by Jack of Rathillet and repaired with advice from David Rhind over the next two years.

See also
 List of listed buildings in Kilmany, Fife
 List of Category A listed buildings in Fife

References

Category A listed buildings in Fife
Listed buildings in Kilmany
Churches completed in 1768
Churches in Fife
Listed churches in Scotland
Church of Scotland churches